The RBC Emerging Playwright Award (presented by Playwrights Guild of Canada as part of the annual Tom Hendry Awards) is a national playwriting competition in Canada which gives its winner a 6-month mentorship and cash prize. This award was created in 2015. It is sponsored by the Royal Bank of Canada.

Past recipients 
2015 - Rafael Antonio Renderos, Salvador
2016 - Rhiannon Collett, Miranda and Dave Begin Again
2017 - Gary Mok, we could be clouds
2018 - David Gagnon Walker, The Big Ship
2019 - Jesse LaVercombe, Hallelujah, It's Holly
2020 - Makram Ayache, Harun
2021 - Zahida Rahemtulla, The Frontliners

References 

Canadian dramatist and playwright awards